The Journal of Personal Selling & Sales Management is a peer-reviewed academic journal covering research on marketing. All submissions undergo double-blind peer review. The journal was established in 1980. Topics covered include sales force motivation, compensation, performance and evaluation, buyer-seller-relationships, team selling, account management, effectiveness of selling approaches, and technology in selling. The journal is published by M. E. Sharpe on behalf of the Pi Sigma Epsilon National Education Foundation.

Abstracting and indexing 
The journal is abstracted and indexed in Business Source Premier, ProQuest, PsycINFO, and Scopus.

Editors 
The following person have been editors-in-chief of the journal:
 2017-... Douglas Hughes, Michigan State University
 2014-2016 Manfred Krafft, University of Münster
 2011-2013 Michael Ahearne, University of Houston
 2009-2010 James Boles, Georgia State University
 2006-2008 Kenneth Evans, University of Missouri
 2002-2005 Greg Marshall, Oklahoma State University
 1999-2001 Jeffery Sager, University of North Texas
 1996-1998 Alan Dubinsky, Metropolitan State University
 1993-1995 Ronald Michaels, Indiana University
 1991-1992 Thomas Ingram, Memphis State University
 1988-1990 Lawrence Chonko, Baylor University
 1985-1987 Thomas Wotruba, San Diego State University
 1982-1985 Marvin Jolson, University of Maryland
 1980-1981 Edwin Simpson, Miami University

References

External links 
 
 Journal page at publisher's website
 Pi Sigma Epsilon National Education Foundation

Marketing journals
Quarterly journals
English-language journals
Publications established in 1980
M. E. Sharpe academic journals